Kawkareik also spelled as Kawkarike, is a town in Karen State, Myanmar. It is the capital of Kawkaraik District and Kawkaraik Township.

History 
The Kawkareik Pass across the Tenasserim Hills is named after this town. The Pass was the access route from Thailand used by the Japanese Fifteenth Army, consisting of two infantry divisions under Lieutenant General Shōjirō Iida, when it invaded the southern Burmese province of Tenasserim (now Tanintharyi Region) in January 1942.

In January 2009, the forces of the Karen National Union and the Democratic Karen Buddhist Army clashed outside Kawkareik.  The DKBA set up their military command post inside the town, and although DKBA soldiers burned down several civilian houses and detained dozens of citizens in villages across the border in Thailand, Kawkareik was left intact.

Climate
Kawkareik has a typical southeastern Myanmar tropical monsoon climate (Köppen Am) featuring an extremely wet wet season from mid-April to early November and a dry season from November to mid-April.

Transport 
Kawkareik lies on the East-West Economic Corridor that links the South China Sea at Da Nang to Mawlamyine through Mae Sot and Myawaddy.

The town has two public high schools; BEHS (1) Kawkareik and BEHS (2) Kawkareik. 

There is no higher education institution in Kawkareik.

Healthcare 
Kawkareik District Public Hospital serves the people of Kawkareik and its surrounding areas.

Notable people from Kawkareik 
 Diramore
 Naing Thet Lwin

References

External links

 Satellite map at Maplandia.com

Township capitals of Myanmar
Populated places in Kayin State